Samantha Angus (born 21 July 1967) is an English writer of historical adventure novels for children. She is the author of five books, including Soldier Dog, Captain, A Horse Called Hero, and The House on Hummingbird Island. Her novels deal with bleak moments of British and colonial history.

Soldier Dog 

Her first novel Soldier Dog, tells the story of a lonely and bullied underage recruit and the Messenger Dog Service in the First World War. The story of Stanley Ryder's dog is based on the true story of Airedale Jack. Soldier Dog won the North East Book Award in 2012, and was long-listed for the CILIP Carnegie Medal award.

Rachel Petty, Editorial Director of Macmillan Children's Books, commented that Soldier Dog is a heartbreaking, historically accurate, and "vivid portrayal of the messenger dogs and their handlers" brought life with "gripping and beautifully written prose". Macmillan secured the world rights to the book in 2012.

New Sparta Films acquired film rights to Soldier Dog, and Angus is collaborating on the adaptation and screenplay.

Other works 

Captain, another WWI novel, tells the story of a young refugee from Central Europe who is recruited to the Mule Corps and serves in the war with his donkey Hey-Ho in Gallipoli and the Middle East. The book was nominated in 2015 for the CILIP Carnegie Medal in 2015.

A Horse Called Hero tells the story of two child evacuees from London during World War II who, in the depths of the British countryside, gradually come to understand that their father, a hero of the First World War, has been imprisoned for cowardice. The story is set in the area of the West Country where Sam lives. Angus has said about her exploration of the relationship between children and animals: "[Children] almost without exception want their own dog, or their own horse, and that longing is intense. They want to love something unconditionally, and be loved in return."

The House on Hummingbird Island, longlisted for the CILIP Carnegie Award and shortlisted for the Cheshire Schools' Book Award, is a coming-of-age story set against the backdrop of the First World War, touching on issues of race, as well as the contribution of the West Indies to the war and their treatment at the hands of the British. As young Idie Grace sheds the skins of her childhood, she confronts the complex truths of her genetic inheritance.

School for Skylarks tells the story of a schoolgirl evacuee from London, who during WWII, is sent to live with an eccentric great-aunt in an equally eccentric stately home. When their home is requisitioned as a school, Lyla's lonely world is turned inside out.

Personal life 
Angus attended Trinity College, Cambridge. She has five children, several horses, and a small white West Highland terrier.

References 

1967 births
Living people
21st-century English women writers
English women novelists
English children's writers
21st-century English novelists
Alumni of Trinity College, Cambridge